Douglas Hugh Reid, OAM was an Australian professional tennis player.

Reid, most active in tennis during the 1950s, competed at all grand slam tournaments during his career. His only overseas tour was in 1954 and included a first round loss to Ham Richardson at the U.S. national championships. He was later a Victoria Racing Club committee member and bred race horse Maybe Mahal, which was named Australian Horse of the Year in 1978. His brothers Jim and Wayne were both noted sports administrators.

References

External links
 
 

Year of birth missing
2014 deaths
Australian male tennis players
Recipients of the Medal of the Order of Australia
Australian horse trainers
Australian sports executives and administrators